Finnish Islamic Party is an unregistered Islamist association in Finland, that aims for the status of a registered political party. It was founded in September 2007 by former KGB spy Abdullah Tammi. Its founders are Finnish converts to Islam.

References

External links 
 

Islamic organisations based in Finland
Civic and political organisations of Finland
Islamic political parties
Islamism in Europe
Political parties established in 2007
Political organisations based in Finland
Non-registered political parties in Finland
2007 establishments in Finland
Multiculturalism in Europe